Croisilles may refer to:

France
Several communes in France:

Croisilles, Calvados, in the Calvados département
Croisilles, Eure-et-Loir, in the Eure-et-Loir département
Croisilles, Orne, in the Orne département
Croisilles, Pas-de-Calais, in the Pas-de-Calais département

Papua New Guinea
Cape Croisilles, Papua New Guinea
Croisilles languages of Papua New Guinea

New Zealand
Croisilles Harbour, New Zealand
Croisilles Peak, New Zealand